The Benjamin Watlington House, at 206 W. Court St. in Weiser, Idaho, was built in 1890.  It was listed on the National Register of Historic Places in 1991.

It is a two-story wood-frame house which was deemed "architecturally important as an example of the Queen Anne style and as the work of James King, Idaho's first architect with professional training."

References

National Register of Historic Places in Washington County, Idaho
Queen Anne architecture in Idaho
Buildings and structures completed in 1890